Mongolicosa songi is a species of wolf spider found in Xinjiang, China and adjacent areas of Mongolia.

This is a dirty-brown coloured spider up to 7.4 mm in length with few distinguishing markings apart from a faint heart-shaped mark on the abdomen. Its closest known relative is M. gobiensis, from which it can be distinguished only by details of the genitalia.

References

Lycosidae
Spiders described in 2003
Spiders of China
Arthropods of Mongolia